Avelia is a genus of karyorelict ciliates belonging to the family Geleiidae.

The genus name is a taxonomic patronyms honoring Marcel Avel (1900–1983; professor of anatomy), with slight modification into the nomen novum Avelia to avoid a taxonomic homonymy with the moth genus Avela.

References 

Karyorelictea
Ciliate genera
Taxa described in 1977